Josef Lammerz (1930 – 8 January 2014) was a German composer, choral director and organist.

Life and career
Josef Lammerz began piano lessons at an early age. He was tutored by Hubert Brings, longtime organist at Bonn Cathedral.
From 1950-1954 he studied sacred music at the Robert Schumann Hochschule, and later further organ studies with Rudolf Petzold at Cologne Cathedral and Clement Ingenhoven in Düsseldorf.

From 1956 until 1975 he became the organist and Choirmaster at Christ-Koenig-Kirche in Duisburg where he developed a very highly regarded choir, performing major choral works, as well as his own compositions. He participated in the municipal concerts with the Duisburg Symphony Orchestra at the Mercator-Halle, with works such as Fauré's Requiem, Verdi's Stabat mater, and Liszt's Christus.

In 1961 to 1975, he took posts as lecturer in professional piano and organ studies at the Niederrheinischen Musikschule in Duisburg, and music theory at the Folkwang Hochschule Essen (Duisburg institute).

In 1975 he moved back to Bonn Cathedral to become the organist and choirmaster.

Since his retirement in 1989, he has spent long periods in Teulada on the Costa Blanca, Spain, and continues to compose. A cantata about the great medieval history of Teulada and his outstanding service to the musical life of the city, he was made an honoured citizen, and a street in nearby Xàtiva has been named after him.

Compositions

References 

Christus Koenig Duisburg, Josef Lammerz retrospective event 2005, in German
National Library of Australia online catalogue
Published music available at Sheet Music Plus
 World Premier of a work by Josef Lammerz in the 4th International Organ Festival of Pedreguer, in Valenciano

External links 
 Published music of Josef Lammerz at Brotons & Mercadal Music Publishers
 Biography of Josef Lammerz at Brotons & Mercadal Music Publishers
 Niederrheinische Musik- und Kunstschule, Duisburg

1930 births
2014 deaths
Musicians from Bonn
20th-century German male musicians